Erten Ersu (born 21 April 1994) is a Turkish footballer who plays as a goalkeeper for Gaziantep.

Professional career
Ersu began his carrier in Fenerbahçe youth team in 2005. From 2011 to 2020, which is the year he left, he didn't appear in any league competition. He made his professional debut on 3 March 2015 with Fenerbahçe in a 5-0 Turkish Cup win against Bayburt Özel İdarespor, replacing Mert Günok after 84 minutes.

On 15 August 2016, Ersu was loaned out to another Süper Lig club Gaziantepspor. He made his debut on 22 September 2016 in a 2-0 Turkish Cup win against Eyüpspor. Ersu, appeared in 8 Turkish Cup and 2 Süper Lig competitions with Gaziantepspor.

On 30 July 2020, Ersu announced he would leave Fenerbahçe after 18 years, including the youth teams. On 22 September 2020, Konyaspor announced the signing of Ersu on a two-year deal.

On 20 July 2022, Ersu signed a two-year contract with Gaziantep.

Personal life

Ersu is enjoying watching Formula 1.

References

External links 
 TFF Official Website – Erten Ersu Profile 
 
 
 Goal.com Profile 

1994 births
Living people
People from Bakırköy
Footballers from Istanbul
Turkish footballers
Turkey youth international footballers
Association football goalkeepers
Fenerbahçe S.K. footballers
Gaziantepspor footballers
Konyaspor footballers
Gaziantep F.K. footballers
Süper Lig players